Lannes can refer to:

 Jean Lannes, one of Napoleon Bonaparte's Marshals
 Lannes (surname)
 Lannes, Lot-et-Garonne, a commune in the Lot-et-Garonne département, in France
 Lannes (province), a former Province of France

See also
 Lanne (disambiguation)